Markham was a federal electoral district in Ontario, Canada created in 1988. Also known as Markham—Whitchurch-Stouffville, it was a federal electoral district that elected representatives to the House of Commons of Canada from 1988 to 2000. Notably in 1997 this was the only district in Ontario that did not elect a Liberal MP or an Independent (York South-Weston).

Markham riding was created from parts of York North and York—Peel ridings. It initially consisted of the towns of Markham and Whitchurch-Stouffville in the Regional Municipality of York. The name of the electoral district was changed in 1989 to "Markham—Whitchurch-Stouffville". The electoral district was redistributed 1996 into Markham, Oak Ridges and Thornhill ridings. The new Markham riding consisted of the part of the Town of Markham east of Highway No. 404 and south of 16th Avenue.

The electoral district was abolished in 2003 when it was redistributed between Markham—Unionville and Oak Ridges—Markham ridings.

Members of Parliament

The riding has elected the following Members of Parliament:

Election results

Markham

Markham—Whitchurch-Stouffville

Markham

See also 

 List of Canadian federal electoral districts
 Past Canadian electoral districts

References

External links 
Parliamentary website: Markham
Parliamentary website: Markham-Whitchurch-Stouffville
Parliamentary website: Markham

Former federal electoral districts of Ontario
Politics of Markham, Ontario